Mount Sinai Baptist Church, also known as Mount Sinai Baptist Church and Cemetery, is a historic African-American Baptist church and cemetery located at 6100 Holy Neck Road in Suffolk, Virginia.  It was built in 1921 by members of the church who were brick masons in the Victorian Gothic Revival style.  It features a two towered façade, pointed Gothic-arched windows of stained glass imported from Germany, and prominent Classical porch.  The church replaced a frame church erected in 1881.  Associated with the church is a cemetery established about 1920.

It was added to the National Register of Historic Places in 2007.

References

Baptist churches in Virginia
African-American history of Virginia
Churches in Suffolk, Virginia
Gothic Revival church buildings in Virginia
Churches completed in 1921
Churches on the National Register of Historic Places in Virginia
National Register of Historic Places in Suffolk, Virginia